Howard C. Kunreuther (born 1938) is an American economist. He is the James G. Dinan professor emeritus of decision sciences and public policy at the Wharton School of the University of Pennsylvania.

Background

He received an A.B. in economics from Bates College, and a PhD in the same subject from the Massachusetts Institute of Technology. He is a fellow of the American Association for the Advancement of Science, and a distinguished fellow of the Society for Risk Analysis.
 
His research focuses on managing and financing losses due to technological and natural hazards such as high-level radioactive waste repositories, and extreme events such as climate change, terrorism, earthquakes, floods, and hurricanes.

Research

Interdependent Security

In an interdependent world, the risks faced by any one agent depend not only on its choices but also on those of others. One weak link in a system can cause large losses to others. An example is the bombing of Pan Am Flight 103 in 1988: the bomb was loaded onto a plane at a low-security airport in Malta and transferred to Pan Am 103 where it was set to explode when the plane was 25,000 feet in the air.

Guiding Principles for Insurance

 Insurance premiums should be based on risk in order to provide signals to individuals as to the hazards they face and to encourage them to engage in cost-effective mitigation measures to reduce their vulnerability to catastrophes.

 Affordability of insurance for low-income residents is an important concern if premiums rise to a level that low-income residents cannot afford.  Kunreuther has proposed a mechanism whereby low-income homeowners could receive a voucher to cover the costs of protecting their property.

The Behavioral Risk Audit

It is important to understand why people often do not purchase insurance voluntarily. When dealing with uncertain and risky events, individuals tend to be myopic, optimistic and to prefer the status quo. A behavioral risk audit addresses these cognitive biases so that individuals are more likely to pay attention to the potential consequences of low-probability events.  Remedial solutions are proposed that work with rather than against people’s risk perceptions and decision biases. When combined with short-term economic incentives, individuals are likely to consider investing in protective measures that reduce the potential consequences of future catastrophic events.

Books

 Kunreuther, H., Meyer, R. J., & Michel-Kerjan, E. O. (Eds.). (2019). The Future of Risk Management. University of Pennsylvania Press. .  
    
 Kunreuther, H., & Useem, M. (2018). Mastering Catastrophic Risk: How Companies Are Coping with Disruption. Oxford University Press. .  
   
 Meyer, R., & Kunreuther, H. (2017).  The Ostrich Paradox: Why We Underprepare for Disasters. Wharton School Press. .   
  
 Kunreuther, H. C., Pauly, M. V., & McMorrow, S. (2013).  Insurance and Behavioral Economics: Improving Decisions in the Most Misunderstood Industry. Cambridge University Press. .   

 Kunreuther, H. C., & Michel-Kerjan, E. O. (2011). At War with the Weather: Managing Large-scale Risks in a New Era of Catastrophes. MIT Press. .   Winner of the 2011 Kulp-Wright Book Award, presented annually by the American Risk and Insurance Association to the author of a book considered to be the most influential text published on the economics of risk management and insurance. 

 Daniels, R., Kettl, D., & Kunreuther, H. (2006). On Risk and Disaster: Lessons from Hurricane Katrina. .  

 Grossi, P., & Kunreuther, H. (2005). Catastrophe Modeling: A New Approach to Managing Risk (Vol. 25). Springer Science & Business Media. .   

 Kunreuther, H. C., & Hoch, S. J. (2001). Wharton on Making Decisions. John Wiley & Sons, Inc. .  

 Kunreuther, Howard, and Richard J. Roth. (1998).   Paying the Price: The Status and Role of Insurance against Natural Disasters in the United States. Washington, D.C.: Joseph Henry Press. . 

 Easterling, D., & Kunreuther, H. (2013).  The Dilemma of Siting a High-level Nuclear Waste Repository (Vol. 5). Springer Science & Business Media. .  

 Kunreuther, H., Ginsberg, R., Miller, L., Sagi, P., Slovic, P., Borkan, B., & Katz, N. (1978).  Disaster Insurance Protection: Public Policy Lessons. New York: Wiley. .   
 
 Dacy, D. C., & Kunreuther, H. The Economics of Natural Disasters: Implications for Federal Policy. .

References

External links
 Wharton Profile
 Wharton Risk Management and Decision Processes Center

1938 births
Living people
MIT School of Humanities, Arts, and Social Sciences alumni
Bates College alumni
Fellows of the American Academy of Arts and Sciences
Wharton School of the University of Pennsylvania faculty
21st-century American economists
20th-century American economists